The Battle of Fano, also known as the Battle of Fanum Fortunae, was fought in 271 between the Roman Empire and the Juthungi. The Romans, led by Emperor Aurelian, were victorious.

Background
Aurelian had been defeated by the Juthungi at the Battle of Placentia in 271, but he had rallied his men, and started pursuing the Juthungi, who were quickly moving towards a defenceless Rome.

The battle
Finally, the Roman Army caught and forced a fight with the Juthungi on the Metaurus River, just inland of Fano. The crucial moment of the battle was when the Juthungi were pinned against the river, so that, when the Germanic line was forced to give way, many of the Juthungi fell into the river and drowned according to the Romans.

Aftermath
In spite of this and a following defeat in the Battle of Pavia, they remained in existence as an independent tribe until at least the beginning of the 5th century and probably even longer. They besieged and ultimately tore down the very important Roman military camp Castra Regina in 356 or 358AD together with the Alamanni. This camp was in fact one of the biggest in all of Roman-ruled Germania and borderland Gallia, and it even had thick stone walls surrounding the camp as well a village within it. The camp laid at what more or less corresponds to modern day Regensburg in Germany. After the Juthungi took the camp the Romans never recovered it or won the area surrounding it back. The Juthungi and Alamanni who had fought alongside them probably settled in the area and became a part of the later germanic nation of Bavaria.

References

Bibliography
 

Fano
Crisis of the Third Century
Fano
Fano 271
Fano 271
3rd century in Italy
271
Fano
Aurelian